Velorini is a tribe of longhorn beetles of the subfamily Lamiinae. It was described by Thomson in 1864.

Taxonomy
 Parapolyacanthia Breuning, 1951
 Phyxium Pascoe, 1864
 Probatodes Thomson, 1864
 Velora Thomson, 1864

References

Lamiinae